Ahanya  is a village in the southern state of Karnataka, India. It is located in the Malur taluk of Kolar district in Karnataka. It is located at the border of Karnataka and Tamil Nadu.

See also
 Kolar
 Districts of Karnataka

References

External links
 http://Kolar.nic.in/

Villages in Kolar district